Ruth Denison (September 29, 1922 – February 26, 2015) was the first Buddhist teacher in the United States to lead an all-women's retreat for Buddhist meditation and instruction. Her center, Dhamma Dena Desert Vipassana Center is located in the Mojave Desert, in Joshua Tree, California. She was also a teacher at the Insight Meditation Society in Barre, Massachusetts.  She sometimes taught at Spirit Rock Meditation Center in Woodacre, California.

Spending her youth and young adult years in Germany, she was a fervent Nazi, later imprisoned by the Russians. She immigrated to the United States. In the 1960s and 1970s, she was part of the alternative and counterculture scene.

She was one of four Westerners to receive permission to teach from Burmese master U Ba Khin, a layperson known for a particular method of awareness practice called Vipassanā, in which the meditator closely observes bodily sensations.

Denison died on February 26, 2015, after suffering a stroke. She was 92.

Bibliography 
 Dancing in the Dharma: The Life and Teachings of Ruth Denison by Sandy Boucher (Boston, MA: Beacon Press, 2005. hardcover, $25.95 )
 Meetings with Remarkable Women: Buddhist Teachers in America by Lenore Friedman (Boston, MA: Shambhala, Revised and Updated Edition, 2000 )

References

External links 
 Dancing in the Dharma
 Bowing to Life Deeply: An Interview with Ruth Denison
 Who's Who in Buddhism (Ruth Denison)
 Dhamma Dena Desert Vipassana Center

1922 births
2015 deaths
American Buddhists
American Theravada Buddhists
German Theravada Buddhists
German Buddhists
Theravada Buddhist spiritual teachers
Female Buddhist spiritual teachers
People from Joshua Tree, California
Students of U Ba Khin